Talybont railway station serves the villages of Tal-y-bont and Llanddwywe in Gwynedd, Wales. The station is an unstaffed halt on the Cambrian Coast Railway with passenger services to Harlech, Porthmadog, Pwllheli, Barmouth, Machynlleth and Shrewsbury. Most trains call only on request.

Services
Most services at Talybont stop on request only.

External links

Railway stations in Gwynedd
DfT Category F2 stations
Former Cambrian Railway stations
Railway stations in Great Britain opened in 1914
Railway stations served by Transport for Wales Rail
Railway request stops in Great Britain
Dyffryn Ardudwy